Pamela Eells O'Connell (born August 29, 1956) is an American television producer and writer.

Her credits include Charles in Charge, Family Matters, Mad About You, The Nanny, Brotherly Love, Married... with Children, Rude Awakening, Ellen, The Suite Life of Zack & Cody, The Suite Life on Deck,  Jessie, Bunk'd, Oye Jassie and Team Kaylie, on Netflix.

She was nominated for two Primetime Emmy Awards for her work on The Suite Life of Zack & Cody, as a part of the producing and writing team. In the first few years of her career she worked with fellow producer and writer Sally Lapiduss until 1995.

In 2010, O'Connell formed the production company Bon Mot Productions, the first series under the company was the third and final season of The Suite Life on Deck.

Filmography

Nominations

References

External links

Television producers from California
American women television producers
American television writers
Living people
American women television writers
Place of birth missing (living people)
1956 births
Showrunners
American women screenwriters
People from San Luis Obispo, California
Screenwriters from California
20th-century American screenwriters
20th-century American women writers
21st-century American screenwriters
21st-century American women writers